Paul Greene may refer to:

 Paul Greene (actor) (born 1974), Canadian actor
 Paul Greene (athlete) (born 1972), Australian athlete and musician
 Paul Chet Greene, member of the Antigua and Barbuda House of Representatives

See also
Paul Green (disambiguation)